The MTV Video Music Award for Best R&B was first awarded in 1993 under the name of Best R&B Video, and it was given every year until 2006, as the following year MTV revamped the VMAs and eliminated all the genre categories. The following year, though, when MTV returned the Video Music Awards to their previous format, Best R&B Video did not return despite four other genre awards doing so.  It was only in 2019 that the R&B award returned to the VMAs, now under the shorter name of Best R&B.  En Vogue, Destiny's Child, Beyoncé, The Weeknd and Alicia Keys are tied as this award's biggest winners, each having won it twice.  Keys is also the category's biggest nominee, receiving her sixth nomination in 2020.

Recipients

Stats

Most Wins:
Beyoncé, Alicia Keys, En Vogue, Destiny's Child, & The Weeknd - 2 wins
Most Nominations: (Including nominations for featured artist)

See also 
 MTV Europe Music Award for Best R&B

MTV Video Music Awards
Awards established in 1993
Awards disestablished in 2006